The 1979 Notre Dame Fighting Irish football team represented the University of Notre Dame during the 1979 NCAA Division I-A football season. The Irish finished unranked in both major polls for the first time since 1963.

Schedule

Roster

Game summaries

at Michigan

Bob Crable (10 tackles) leaped to block the potential-game winning field in the final seconds.

at Purdue

Michigan State

Georgia Tech

at Air Force

USC

South Carolina

Navy

ND: Ferguson 34 Rush, 155 Yds (first player in school history with 3,000 career rushing yards)

at Tennessee

Clemson

vs. Miami (FL)

Team players in the NFL

References

Notre Dame
Notre Dame Fighting Irish football seasons
Notre Dame Fighting Irish football